Fahim Rahim (born December 14, 1973) is an American Nephrologist and chairman of Idaho based JRM foundation For humanity and Co-founder of Idaho Kidney Institute. He received the Ellis Island Medals of Honor for his contribution to achievements in dialysis and kidney care.

Early life and education 
Rahim a Pakistani American was born in Peshawar, Pakistan as his father Mohammad Rahim was an Army officer and mother was a nurse in the Army. He went to Aga Khan medical college for medicine and graduated in 1997. He is fluent in English, Urdu and Punjabi.

Career

Medical practice 
Fahim & his brother Naeem Rahim trained from New York Medical College in internal medicine and later nephrology. They choose to move to a small town in Idaho to provide better health care to the much needed rural America. Naeem Rahim and Fahim Rahim both received Ellis Island Medals of Honor in 2010 and subsequently multiple congressional records in recognition of their services to state of Idaho. They were the first Idahoans to receive the Ellis Island Medals of Honor. They decided to honor the people of Idaho and started JRM foundation For humanity. Fahim Rahim & Naeem also started Idaho hometown heroes Medal which identifies and celebrates individuals who serve their communities in Idaho.
Dr. Fahim Rahim is affiliated with Bingham Memorial Hospital and Eastern Idaho Regional Medical Center.

Philanthropy
On April 25, 2015, the Nepal earthquake with a magnitude of 7.8Mw caused severe devastation in Nepal. More than 8,800 deaths were reported while more than 23,000 people reportedly suffered from light to heavy injuries. In response to the Nepal earthquake, Rahim had led a humanitarian mission with one of the largest privately funded American relief team in 2015 Nepal earthquake which very quickly turned into one of the largest International team with hundreds of volunteers and people from many countries including America, Canada, India, Pakistan, Nepal and Dubai. Dr. Fahim initiated a #MillionDollarChallenge CrowdRise crowdfunding campaign to President Obama with the goal of raising $1 Million, that went viral. The JRM Foundation raised close to $180,000 from the campaign.  Fahim also wrote a Congressional letter with a petition that was signed by over 25 American and International Nepali organizations out of the US. After spending two weeks in Nepal helping with the relief efforts, Fahim returned to East Idaho and hosted a rally at Klyde Warren Park to provide quake relief to Nepal.

Photography
A photography exhibition displayed through April 5, 2015 at Wood River Community YMCA “The Face of Hope”. The exhibit, with photographed by Rahim themed raises awareness and explores the hardships of bonded slavery and child labor.

Cycling
Fahim raced 100 mile races and sponsored and raised money for Idaho Trails and healthy life styles.

Institutional positions
Founder and Chairman Board of Directors for JRM Foundation for Humanity, a non-profit organization looking to raise funds for charities of choice.
Founding member and Chairman of 3iSessions.
Founding member of Hike4Humanity group.
Founding member Idaho Kidney Institute.
Member of the board of directors of Idaho State University Foundation.
Founding member and Chairman for Idaho's Hometown Hero Medal.
Founder and Chairman Board of Directors for JRM Foundation for Humanity, a non-profit organization looking to raise funds for charities of choice.
Managing Partner of Idaho Kidney Institute, LLP
Managing Partnerof Idaho Kidney Consultants, LLC
Director of Idaho Kidney Center, Pocatello
Director of Idaho Kidney Center, Blackfoot

Awards
Recipient of US Senate Congressional Record in 2007 from Senator Mike Crapo.
Recipient of Ellis Island Medals of Honor, in 2011.
Recipient of Congressional Record by US House of Representatives in July, 2011 (Hon. Dan Burton of Indiana, Co-Chair Congressional Pakistan Caucus)
Recipient of Congressional Record by US House 112th Congress Sept. 2011

References 

1973 births
American medical journalists
American nephrologists
American radio journalists
Living people
People from Pocatello, Idaho
New York Medical College alumni
Aga Khan University alumni
Pakistani emigrants to the United States
American physicians of Pakistani descent